Michael Jay may refer to:
 Michael Jay, Baron Jay of Ewelme, British politician and diplomat
 Michael Jay (producer), American songwriter, record producer and studio owner

See also